ZEGG may refer to:
ZEGG (band), a Raleigh, North Carolina-based band formed in 2004
ZEGG (community), an experimental ecovillage near Berlin, Germany